Events from the year 1933 in the United Kingdom.

Incumbents
 Monarch – George V
 Prime Minister – Ramsay MacDonald (Coalition)
 Parliament – 36th

Events
 January – The London Underground diagram designed by Harry Beck is introduced to the public.
 9 February – The King and Country debate: The Oxford Union student debating society passes a resolution stating, "That this House will in no circumstances fight for its King and country."
 28 February – English cricket team in Australia in 1932–33: Tour concludes with the England cricket team winning The Ashes using the controversial bodyline tactic.
 25 March – First car race at Donington Park circuit in Leicestershire.
 28 March – 1933 Imperial Airways Dixmude crash: The Imperial Airways Armstrong Whitworth Argosy biplane airliner City of Liverpool catches fire in the air over Belgium and crashes, killing the crew of three and all twelve passengers, the deadliest accident in the history of British civil aviation to this date. The fire onboard may have been started deliberately.
 2 April – As a member of the English cricket team touring New Zealand, 1933, batsman Wally Hammond scores a record 336 runs in a test match at Eden Park, Auckland.
 3 April – The Marquess of Douglas and Clydesdale leads an expedition to be the first to fly an aircraft over Mount Everest.
 27 April – The Jessop & Son department store in Nottingham is acquired by the John Lewis Partnership, its first store outside London.
 30 April – First air service internal to Scotland, Renfrew–Campbeltown, operated by Midland & Scottish Air Ferries Ltd. Winifred Drinkwater, "the world's first female commercial pilot", is hired to fly the route.
 2 May – First modern "sighting" of the Loch Ness Monster.
 3 May
 Prime Minister Ramsay MacDonald arrives back in the UK following talks with U.S. President Roosevelt on the global economic situation.
 In the Irish Free State, Dáil Éireann abolishes the Oath of Allegiance to the British Crown.
 1 July – London Passenger Transport Board begins operations, unifying multiple earlier services.
 15 July – Signing of the Four-Power Pact by the UK, France, Germany and Italy.
 26 July – Battersea Power Station, London, first generates electricity.
 28 July – Grand jury abolished in English law.
 12 August – Winston Churchill makes his first public speech warning of the dangers of German rearmament.
 17 August – Release of the film The Private Life of Henry VIII. Charles Laughton receives an Academy Award for the title rôle (16 March 1934), making this the first British film to win an Oscar.
 September – National Grid completed.
 6 October – Milk Marketing Board established.
 13 October – British Interplanetary Society founded in Liverpool.
 15 October – The Rolls-Royce Merlin aircraft engine is run for the first time (on bench test in Derby).
 23 October – Birmingham city council's 40,000th council house (on the Weoley Castle estate) is opened by Chancellor of the Exchequer Neville Chamberlain.
 27 October – George Eyston achieves a world land speed record for a diesel car of 101.98 mph (164.12 km/h) at Brooklands.
 21 December
 Newfoundland returns to Crown Colony status following financial collapse.
 The British Plastics Federation (the oldest in the world) is founded.

Undated
 Norman Angell wins the Nobel Peace Prize.
 Albert Einstein makes several visits to Britain and campaigns against the Nazi regime in Germany from which he has been exiled.
 Ronald Lockley establishes the first British bird observatory on the Welsh island of Skokholm.

Publications
 Agatha Christie's Hercule Poirot novel Lord Edgware Dies.
 Robert Hichens' novel The Paradine Case.
 James Hilton's utopian novel Lost Horizon.
 A. G. Macdonell's comic novel England, Their England.
 George Orwell's book Down and Out in Paris and London.
 Angela Thirkell's novel High Rising.
 H.G. Wells' novel The Shape of Things to Come.
 Dennis Wheatley's first published novel The Forbidden Territory.

Births
 5 January – Derek Johnson, athlete (died 2004)
 6 January 
 John Clive, author and actor (died 2012)
 Ian McColl, Baron McColl of Dulwich, surgeon and academic
 13 January – Janet Kear, ornithologist (died 2004)
 18 January
 David Bellamy, botanist, author, broadcaster and environmental campaigner (died 2019)
 John Boorman, film director
 26 January – Peter Zinovieff, engineer and composer (died 2021)
 2 February 
 Rodney Gordon, architect (died 2008)
 Tony Jay, British-American actor (died 2006)
 6 February – Leslie Crowther, television comedian and game show host (died 1996)
 7 February – John Anderton, footballer
 8 February – Donald Burgess, track cyclist
 9 February – John Michell, writer (died 2009)
 17 February – Cedric Robinson, Queen's Guide to the Sands (died 2021)
 18 February
 Sir Bobby Robson, footballer and football manager (died 2009)
 Mary Ure, actress (died 1975)
 22 February – Katharine, Duchess of Kent, née Worsley
 27 February – Stan Anderson, English football player, manager (died 2018) 
 9 March – Sir David Weatherall, physician (died 2018)
 12 March – Ken Hodgkisson, English footballer (died 2018)
 14 March – Sir Michael Caine, actor
 17 March – Dame Penelope Lively, novelist
 23 March – Norman Bailey, opera singer (died 2021)
 25 March – Ray Spencer, footballer (died 2016)
 1 April – Brianne Murphy, cinematographer (died 2003)
 4 April – Brian Hewson, track and field athlete
 6 April
 Sir Roy Goode, legal academic
 Dudley Sutton, actor (died 2018)
 14 April – Paddy Hopkirk, Northern Ireland-born rally driver (died 2022)
 16 April – Joan Bakewell, broadcaster
 18 April – Michael Bradshaw, actor (died 2001)
 19 April 
Dickie Bird, cricketer and umpire
Philip Lavallin Wroughton, politician, Lord Lieutenant of Berkshire (died 2020)
 21 April – Ian Carr, jazz musician (died 2009)
 24 April – Claire Davenport, actress (died 2002)
 27 April – Peter Imbert, Commissioner of Police of the Metropolis (died 2017)
 9 May – Jessica Steele, romance novelist (died 2020)
 10 May – Barbara Taylor Bradford, English–born novelist
 15 May – Peter Broadbent, footballer (died 2013) 
 17 May – Shelley Rohde, journalist and author (died 2007)
 22 May – Don Estelle, actor (died 2003)
 23 May – Joan Collins, actress
 24 May – Anne Mustoe, teacher, cyclist and travel writer (died 2009)
 25 May – Ray Spencer, footballer (died 2016)
 29 May – Nick Whitehead, Olympic sprinter (died 2002)
 2 June – David Mudd, politician (died 2020)
 7 June – Stanley Clarke, businessman (died 2004)
 8 June – Robert Stevens, English lawyer and academic (died 2021)
 10 June – Colin Grainger, footballer (died 2022)
 14 June – John McHardy Sinclair, linguist (died 2007)
 16 June – John Cunliffe, author (died 2018)
 22 June – Tony Booth, poster artist (died 2017)
 26 June – David Winnick, Labour Party politician
 1 July – Joe Buick, Scottish footballer
 6 July – Frank Austin, footballer (died 2004)
 7 July – Bruce Wells, boxer, actor (died 2009)
 8 July – Jeff Nuttall, actor, poet and painter (died 2004)
 9 July – Oliver Sacks, English-born neurologist (died 2015)
 13 July – David Storey, novelist and playwright (died 2017)
 15 July – Julian Bream, guitarist and lutenist (died 2020)
 22 July – Alexander Trotman, businessman (died 2005)
 29 July – Peter Baldwin, actor (d. 2015) 
 2 August – Tom Bell, actor (died 2006)
 5 August – Nicholas Scott, politician (died 2005)
 9 August – Albert Quixall, footballer (died 2020)
 10 August
 Elizabeth Butler-Sloss, judge
 Keith Duckworth, automotive engineer (died 2005)
 11 August – Chris Harris, basketball player
 15 August
 Rita Hunter, opera singer (died 2001)
 Michael Rutter, Lebanese-English psychiatrist and academic (died 2021)
 18 August – Michael Baxandall, art historian (died 2008)
 21 August
 Janet Baker, mezzo-soprano
 Barry Norman, film critic (died 2017)
 2 September – Victor Spinetti, actor (died 2012)
 4 September – George Claydon, actor (died 2001)
 8 September – Michael Frayn, playwright and novelist
 11 September – Margaret Booth, judge (died 2021)
 20 September – Dennis Viollet, English footballer (died 1999)
 26 September – Nicholas J. Phillips, physicist (died 2009)
 2 October – John Gurdon, developmental biologist, recipient of the Nobel Prize in Physiology or Medicine
 9 October 
 Peter Mansfield, physicist, recipient of the Nobel Prize in Physiology or Medicine (died 2017)
 Bill Tidy, cartoonist and illustrator (died 2023)
 11 October – Richard Abel Smith, British army officer (died 2004)
 13 October – Thomas Bingham, judge (died 2010)
 21 October – Maureen Duffy, English poet, playwright, author and activist
 24 October – Kray twins, gangsters (died 1995 & 2000)
 25 October – Peter Dennis, actor (died 2009)
 3 November – John Barry, film score composer (died 2011)
 8 November – Peter Arundell, racing driver (died 2009)
 9 November – Geoff Gunney, English rugby league footballer (died 2018)
 23 November – John Sanders, organist and composer (died 2003)
 2 December – Peter Robin Harding, air marshal and pilot (died 2021)
 3 December – Rosalind Knight, actress (died 2020)
 14 December – David Maloney, television producer (died 2006)
 29 December – Samuel Brittan, economic journalist (died 2020)

Deaths
 January – Bowman Malcolm, railway engineer, Belfast and Northern Counties Railway (born 1854)
 5 January 
 Arthur Borton, soldier, Victoria Cross recipient (born 1883)
 J. M. Robertson, politician, writer and journalist (born 1856)
 7 January – Margaret Macdonald Mackintosh, artist and designer (born 1864)
 14 January – Sir Robert Jones, 1st Baronet, orthopaedic surgeon (born 1857)
 31 January – John Galsworthy, novelist, Nobel Prize laureate (born 1867)
 2 February – Sir Herbert Cory, politician (born 1857)
 22 April – Sir Henry Royce, car manufacturer (born 1863)
 7 June – Sir Morley Fletcher, physiologist and administrator (born 1873)
 14 June – Sir Ernest William Moir, civil engineer (born 1862)
 16 July – Sir Tudor Walters, politician (born 1866)
 25 July – John May, Scottish international footballer (born 1878)
 31 July – Robert Fleming, financier (born 1845)
 10 August – Alf Morgans, Welsh-born Prime Minister of Western Australia (born 1850)
 12 October – John Lister, politician (born 1847)
 18 October 
 Christine Murrell, medical doctor, first female member of the British Medical Association's Central Council (born 1874)
 Ivor Herbert, 1st Baron Treowen, soldier and politician (born 1851)
 20 November – Augustine Birrell, author and politician (born 1850)
 30 November – Harry de Windt, explorer (born 1856 in France)
 19 December – George Jackson Churchward, locomotive engineer, Great Western Railway (railway accident) (born 1857)
 21 December – Dora Montefiore, suffragist and socialist (born 1851)
 26 December – Henry Watson Fowler, lexicographer (born 1858)
 30 December – Dugald Cowan, educationalist and Liberal politician (born 1865)

See also
 List of British films of 1933

References

 
Years of the 20th century in the United Kingdom